
Sant Pere de Ribes is a town in the center of the Garraf comarca, in Barcelona province, Catalonia, Spain. The remains of a 12th-century castle once ruled by the troubadour Guillem de Ribes are in the town.

Education

Lycée Français Bel-Air Garraf, a French international school, is in Sant Pere de Ribes. The city is also home to Richmond International School, a Finnish-style school for students between the ages of 3 and 18.

Culture
Main festivals include:

Festa Major de Sant Pere (29 June)
Festa Major de Sant Pau (25 January)
Festa Major de Santa Eulàlia (12 February)
Festa Major de Sant Joan (24 June)

Sources
 Panareda Clopés, Josep Maria; Rios Calvet, Jaume; Rabella Vives, Josep Maria (1989). Guia de Catalunya, Barcelona: Caixa de Catalunya.  (Spanish).  (Catalan).

References

External links 
Official website 
Historic and artistical buildings 
 Government data pages 

Municipalities in Garraf